Darwin Deez is an American indie band from New York City signed to music label Lucky Number Music. The group's frontman, Darwin Deez (Darwin Merwan Smith), grew up in Chapel Hill, North Carolina, attended Wesleyan University, and has been a guitarist for Creaky Boards. Darwin Smith lives in Brooklyn, New York.

History
The band began to receive public attention in the United Kingdom during late 2009, which followed the release of the band's debut single, "Constellations". In April 2010, the band released their second single, "Radar Detector", which reached number 62 in the UK Singles Chart, number 5 on the UK Indie Chart. He has appeared on the cover of the NME and was placed in the Top 10 of their annual Cool List. The band's self-titled debut album, Darwin Deez, was released on 12 April 2010 in the United Kingdom and on 22 February 2011 in the United States. The third single from the album, "Up In The Clouds", was released on 12 July 2010.

In February 2011, they released a mixtape titled Wonky Beats. Darwin Deez embarked on a tour of Australia in April 2011, during which time they played at the Groovin the Moo festival and a number of side-shows.

In February 2013, Darwin Deez released their second album titled Songs for Imaginative People and went on tour to support the album.

Darwin Deez released their third studio album, titled Double Down, on September 18, 2015, via Lucky Number.

Their latest album, 10 Songs That Happened When You Left Me with My Stupid Heart, was released in 2018.

In 2018, the band embarked on a House Show Tour, booking performances at fans' homes across the country. The tour was filmed as a documentary by Sound It Out films.

Discography

Albums

Mixtapes

Singles

Music videos

References

Musical groups from New York City
American folk musical groups
Musical groups established in 2009
Indie rock musical groups from New York (state)